The Combat is a lost silent film drama directed by Ralph Ince and starring Anita Stewart. It was produced by the Vitagraph Company of America.

Cast
Anita Stewart - Muriel Fleming
John S. Robertson - Philip Lewis
Richard Turner - Graydon Burton
Virginia Norden - Mrs. Fleming
Winthrop Mendell - Herman Slade
Wilfred Lytell - (*uncredited)

References

External links
The Combat at IMDB.com

1916 films
American silent feature films
Films directed by Ralph Ince
Lost American films
Vitagraph Studios films
1916 drama films
American black-and-white films
Silent American drama films
1916 lost films
Lost drama films
1910s American films